Gossina is a department or commune of Nayala Province in western Burkina Faso. Its capital lies at the town of Gossina. According to the 1996 census the department has a total population of 17,945.

Towns and villages
Gossina	(3 596 inhabitants) (capital)
 Bosson	(717 inhabitants)
 Boum	(77 inhabitants)
 Kalabo	(977 inhabitants)
 Koayo	(977 inhabitants)
 Kwon	(3 358 inhabitants)
 Lekoun	(453 inhabitants)
 Madamao	(542 inhabitants)
 Massako	(902 inhabitants)
 Naboro	(612 inhabitants)
 Nianankoré	(169 inhabitants)
 Nyfou	(921 inhabitants)
 Sui	(1 7845 inhabitants)
 Tandou	(232 inhabitants)
 Tarba	(564 inhabitants)
 Zelassé	(2 078 inhabitants)

References

Departments of Burkina Faso
Nayala Province